Rideback (formerly Lin Pictures until 2018) is a film production company formed on December 12, 2007 by producer Dan Lin. Its films include The Lego Movie franchise.

History 
On December 12, 2007, Dan Lin announced that he would leave Warner Bros. as senior vice president of production, to launch his company Lin Pictures.

In 2008, the studio hired Jon Silk as vice president of production and Stephen Gilchrist as director of development for film production.

In 2011, they launched its own roots into television, signing a deal with Warner Bros. Television, to produce TV shows, and hired Jennifer Gwartz to run the new television division with Dan Lin.

In 2014, the studio was successful in the television industry when their first TV show Forever was picked up to series by ABC. It even gained more success when the studio's second TV series Lethal Weapon by Fox and it ended up gaining more success.

In 2017, they hired TriStar Television executive Lindsey Liberatore as senior vice president of its television unit.

In 2018, the studio was renamed to Rideback, as a next generation company to focus on filmmaker collaboration.

In 2019, the studio and Media Rights Capital decided to launch the Rideback TV Incubator and kick off with the inaugural class of writers and mentors for the TV incubator.

The company most recently signed a deal with Universal Pictures.

Filmography

Theatrical films

2000s

2010s

2020s

Upcoming

Direct-to-video/streaming films

2010s

Upcoming

TV shows

2010s

2020s

Upcoming

References

External links 
 Official website
 Lin Pictures on the Internet Movie Database
 Rideback on the Internet Movie Database

Film production companies of the United States
Television production companies of the United States
Entertainment companies based in California
Companies based in Los Angeles
Entertainment companies established in 2007
2007 establishments in California